Zhang Lei (born May 9, 1988, Anshan) is a Chinese female water polo player. She was part of the Chinese team that won silver at the 2011 World Championships.  At the 2012 Summer Olympics, she competed for the China women's national water polo team in the women's event. She is 5 ft 7 inches tall.

See also
 List of World Aquatics Championships medalists in water polo

References

External links
 

Chinese female water polo players
1988 births
Living people
Olympic water polo players of China
Water polo players at the 2012 Summer Olympics
Asian Games medalists in water polo
Water polo players at the 2010 Asian Games
Asian Games gold medalists for China
Medalists at the 2010 Asian Games
World Aquatics Championships medalists in water polo
Universiade medalists in water polo
Sportspeople from Anshan
Universiade gold medalists for China
Medalists at the 2011 Summer Universiade
21st-century Chinese women